The 1939 Copa Ibarguren was the 16th edition of the national cup of Argentina. The cup was contested by the champions of both competitions, the Primera División and the Torneo del Litoral.

Independiente (Primera División champion) faced Central Córdoba de Rosario (champion of "Torneo del Litoral") at San Lorenzo de Almagro's venue, Estadio Gasómetro, in the Boedo neighborhood of Buenos Aires, on March 31, 1940. Independiente easily defeated Central Córdoba 5–0, thereby winning their second consecutive Copa Ibarguren trophy.

Qualified teams

Match details

Notes

References 

Club Atlético Independiente matches
1939 in Argentine football
1939 in South American football